The Philippine Air Force women's volleyball team is the official women's volleyball team of the Philippine Air Force. It competes in various tournaments, including the Premier Volleyball League, where it is known as the Philippine Air Force Jet Spikers and formerly, Philippine Air Force Air Spikers. The team is composed of enlisted personnel and reinforced with civilian players from time to time.

From 2014 to 2015, the team collaborated with the RC Cola Raiders in the Philippine Superliga, sharing its players and coaching staff, competing as the RC Cola-Air Force Raiders.

Current roster 

Coaching staff
 Head coach: MSgt. Jasper Jimenez
 Assistant coach: Jerry Lomingin

Team staff
 Team manager: Randy Tibayan 
 Team trainer: Ray Acojedo

Medical staff
 Team physician:
 Physical therapist: Cris Rey Estrada

Previous roster 

For the 2018 Premier Volleyball League Reinforced Conference:

For the Premier Volleyball League 1st Season Open Conference:

Coaching staff
 Head coach: TSgt. Jasper Jimenez
 Assistant coach(s): Jerry Lomingin

Team Staff
 Team Manager: Randy Tibayan
 Team Trainer: Ray Acojedo

Medical Staff
 Team Physician:
 Physical Therapist: Cris Rey Estrada

For the Premier Volleyball League 1st Season Reinforced Open Conference:

Coaching staff
 Head coach: TSgt. Jasper Jimenez
 Assistant coach(s): Jerry Lomingin

Team Staff
 Team Manager: Anna Mae Calma
 Team Utility: 

Medical Staff
 Team Physician:
 Physical Therapist:

For the Shakey's V-League 13th Season Open Conference:

For the Shakey's V-League 11th Season Open Conference:

Honors

Team

Premier Volleyball League

POC-PSC Philippine National Games

Individual

Premier Volleyball League

Others

Team captains 
  Wendy Anne Semana (2011 - 2016), (2019)
  Joy Gazelle Cases (2017)
  Myla Pablo (2018)

See also 
 RC Cola Raiders
 Philippine Air Force Air Spikers

References

External links 
 

Women's volleyball teams in the Philippines
Shakey's V-League
Sports teams in Metro Manila